Carter Carl Gordon(born 29 January 2001) is an Australian professional rugby union player who plays for the Melbourne Rebels in Super Rugby. His position is fly-half. He was signed for the Queensland Reds squad in 2020 but relocated to Melbourne in 2021 to join the Rebels. Since his move to the Rebels, Gordon has remained with the team and has since become the starting fly-half for the team, and re-signed for the team, in 2022, until the end of 2024.

Super Rugby statistics

References

External links
Rugby.com.au profile
itsrugby.co.uk profile

Australian rugby union players
Living people
Rugby union fly-halves
Queensland Reds players
2001 births
Queensland Country (NRC team) players
Melbourne Rebels players
Rugby union players from Queensland